Desulfoconvexum  is a bacteria genus from the family of Desulfobacteraceae with one known species (Desulfoconvexum algidum).

References

Further reading 
 

Desulfobacterales
Bacteria genera
Monotypic bacteria genera